Kurt Scott Kaleo Moylan (born January 14, 1939) is a Guamanian politician who served as the 1st Lieutenant Governor of Guam from January 4, 1971 to January 6, 1975 and the 7th and last Secretary of Guam from July 20, 1969 to January 4, 1971 in the administration of Governor of Guam Carlos Camacho.

Biography
Moylan is one of four children born to businessman Francis "Scotty" Moylan (1916–2010) and his wife, Yuk Lan Ho, who is of Chinese and Hawaiian descent. Scotty Moylan, moved to Guam from Chicago following World War II and became one of the island's most successful businesspeople. Kurt Moylan has three siblings – Richard, Lena and Francis Jr.

Moylan is married to Judith A. Moylan, the couple have four children Cassandra, Kaleo, Miki and Troy and many grandchildren.

See also 
 List of minority governors and lieutenant governors in the United States

References

1939 births
Guamanian people of Chinese descent
Guamanian people of Irish descent
Guamanian people of Native Hawaiian descent
Guamanian people of Polish descent
Guamanian Republicans
Lieutenant Governors of Guam
Living people